Reg Helwer is a Canadian politician, who was elected to the Legislative Assembly of Manitoba in the 2011 election. He represents the electoral district of Brandon West as a member of the Progressive Conservative Party of Manitoba caucus. In October 23, 2019 He served as The minister of Labour, Consumer Protection and Government Services (Called Central Services from 2016-2022) and served briefly as minister of Infrastructure.

Electoral record

References

External links
Reg Helwer

Living people
People from Selkirk, Manitoba
Politicians from Brandon, Manitoba
Progressive Conservative Party of Manitoba MLAs
21st-century Canadian politicians
Year of birth missing (living people)